Loei is a town (thesaban mueang) in northeast Thailand.  Loei covers the whole tambon of Mueang Loei district and is the capital of Loei province. In 2017, Loei had a population of 21,013. Loei lies 545 km north-northeast of Bangkok, 150 km west of Udon Thani.

Geography
Loei is in the fertile valley of the Loei River, which runs from south to north through the eastern part of the town.

Climate
Loei has a tropical savanna climate (Köppen climate classification Aw). Winters are quite dry and very warm. The monsoon season is from late April to October, with heavy rain and somewhat cooler temperatures during the day, although nights remain warm.

Transportation
Route 201 leads from Chiang Khan in the north on the border with Laos, through Loei, to Non Sa-at near Chum Phae. Route 203 leads west to the vicinity of Phu Ruea, and then turns south to Lom Sak.

Loei is served by Loei Airport.

References

External links

Populated places in Loei province
Cities and towns in Thailand
Isan